This discography covers the work of the English band Van der Graaf Generator.

Albums

Studio albums

Live albums

Compilation and demo albums

Singles
UK releases, except where noted.

Notes:

Videos

References

External links
 Official Peter Hammill website (and Van der Graaf Generator CD shop)
 Van der Graaf Generator (and Peter Hammill) discography at the VdGG fansite
 

 Discography
Discographies of British artists
Rock music group discographies
Pop music group discographies